Otaqlı is a village in Azerbaijan.

Otaqlı may also refer to:

 Otaqlu
 Otağlı, Damal